Sane may refer to:

Places 
 Sane (Pallene), ancient Greek city on Pallene
 Sane (Acte), ancient Greek city on Acte (Mount Athos)
 Sâne Vive, a river in France
 Sane, Mali
 Vicecomodoro Ángel de la Paz Aragonés Airport, the ICAO code for the airport in Argentina

People 
 Sané, a French and Senegalese surname (including a list of persons with this surname)
 Sane Guruji, Indian author and social reformer
 Dan Sane (1896–1956), American musician
 Geeta Sane (1907–1991), Indian writer
 Justin Sane (born 1973), American guitarist and singer for punk rock band Anti-Flag
 Justin Bastard Sane (born 1976), American comic book writer
 Leroy Sané (born 1996), German footballer
 Narayan Sane (1909–2002), Indian cricket umpire
 Sanjeev Sane, Indian political and social activist
 Tidiane Sane (born 1985), Senegalese footballer
 San E (born 1985), South Korean rapper

Acronym 
 SANE, the Committee for a SANE Nuclear Policy, now known as Peace Action
 SANE (charity), a mental health charity in the UK
 Scanner Access Now Easy, a free software package for scanner, webcam and digicam computer access
 Standard Apple Numerics Environment, an obsolete software implementation of IEEE 754 floating point arithmetic
 Sexual Assault Nurse Examiner, a nurse with specialized training in the care and forensic examination of victims of sexual assault
 Society for Andaman and Nicobar Ecology, also known as SANE

Other uses 
sane, an English word meaning "of sound mind"; see Sanity
 "Sane", a song from One Second by Paradise Lost
 "Sane", a song from The True Human Design by Meshuggah

See also
Sain (disambiguation)
Sani (disambiguation)